Ruslan may refer to:

 Ruslan (film), a 2009 film starring Steven Segal
 Ruslan (given name), male name used mainly in Slavic countries, with list of people
 Antonov An-124 Ruslan, large Soviet cargo aircraft, later built in Ukraine and Russia
 SS Ruslan, a Russian cargo ship in the Third Aliyah in 1919

See also
 Rusian (disambiguation)
 Ruslan and Ludmila (disambiguation)